Conversion rate optimization (CRO) is the process of increasing the percentage of users or website visitors to take a desired action (such as buying a product or leaving contact details).

History 
Online conversion rate optimization (or website optimization) was born out of the need of e-commerce marketers to improve their website's performance in the aftermath of the dot-com bubble, when technology companies started to be more aware about their spending, investing more in website analytics. After the burst, with website creation being more accessible, tons of pages with bad user experience were created. As competition grew on the web during the early 2000s, website analysis tools became available, and awareness of website usability grew, internet marketers were prompted to produce measurables for their tactics and improve their website's user experience.

In 2004, new tools enabled internet marketers to experiment with website design and content variations to determine which layouts, copy text, offers, and images perform best. Testing started to be more accessible and known. This form of optimization accelerated in 2007 with the introduction of the free tool Google Website Optimizer. Today, optimization and conversion are key aspects of many digital marketing campaigns. A research study conducted among internet marketers in 2017, for example, showed that 50% of respondents thought that CRO was "crucial to their overall digital marketing strategy".

Conversion rate optimization shares many principles with direct response marketing – a marketing approach that emphasizes tracking, testing, and on-going improvement. Direct marketing was popularized in the early twentieth century and supported by the formation of industry groups such as the Direct Marketing Association, which was formed in 1917 and later named Data & Marketing Association and acquired by the Association of National Advertisers following the announcement on May 31, 2018.

Like modern day conversion rate optimization, direct response marketers also practice A/B split-testing, response tracking, and audience testing to optimize mail, radio, and print campaigns.

Methodology 
Conversion rate optimization seeks to increase the percentage of website visitors that take a specific action (often submitting a web form, making a purchase, signing up for a trial, etc.) by methodically testing alternate versions of a page or process, and through removing impediments to user experience and improving page loading speeds. In doing so, businesses are able to generate more leads or sales without investing more money on website traffic, hence increasing their marketing return on investment and overall profitability.

Statistical significance helps understand that the result of a test is not achieved merely on the basis of chance.

There are several approaches to conversion optimization with two main schools of thought prevailing in the last few years. One school is more focused on testing to discover the best way to increase website, campaign, or landing page conversion rates. The other school is focused on the pretesting stage of the optimization process. In this second approach, the optimization company will invest a considerable amount of time understanding the audience and then creating a targeted message that appeals to that particular audience. Only then would it be willing to deploy testing mechanisms to increase conversion rates.

Calculation of conversion rate 
A conversion rate is defined as the percentage of visitors who complete a goal, as set by the site owner. It is calculated as the total number of conversions, divided by the total number people who visited your website.

 

For example: Your website receives 100 visitors in a day and 15 visitors sign up for your email newsletter (your chosen conversion to measure). Your conversion rate would be 15% for that day.

See also
Audience screen
Behavioral targeting
Conversion Marketing
Conversion rate
Digital marketing engineer
Direct marketing
Internet marketing
Multivariate testing
Promotion
Split testing
Web personalization
A/B testing
User Intent
Search engine optimization
Google PageSpeed Tools

References

Digital marketing